John Armstrong Corby (28 December 1898 – 15 November 1970) was an Australian rules footballer who played with Melbourne in the Victorian Football League (VFL).

Notes

External links 

1898 births
Australian rules footballers from Victoria (Australia)
Melbourne Football Club players
1970 deaths